Elections were held in Lambton County, Ontario on October 24, 2022, in conjunction with municipal elections across the province.

Lambton County Council
Lambton County Council includes the mayors of each constituent municipality, the deputy mayors of Lambton Shores and St. Clair plus four city councillors from Sarnia.

Brooke-Alvinston

Mayor
The following were the results for mayor of Brooke-Alvinston.

Dawn-Euphemia

Mayor
Alan Broad was re-elected as mayor of Dawn-Euphemia by acclamation.

Enniskillen

Mayor
Kevin Marriott was re-elected as mayor of Enniskillen by acclamation.

Lambton Shores
The following were the results for mayor and deputy mayor of Lambton Shores.

Mayor
Incumbent mayor Bill Weber did not run for re-election. Running to replace him were deputy mayor Doug Cook and Marilyn Smith.

Deputy mayor

Oil Springs

Mayor

Petrolia

Mayor
The following were the results for mayor of Petrolia.

Plympton-Wyoming

Mayor
Incumbent mayor Lonny Nappier did not run for re-election. Running for the seat was deputy mayor Muriel Wright and councillors Gary Atkinson and Tim Wilkins.

Point Edward

Mayor
Bev Hand was re-elected mayor of Point Edward by acclamation.

Sarnia
The following were the results for mayor and city council of Sarnia.

Mayor
Incumbent mayor Mike Bradley ran for re-election. He was challenged by city councillor Nathan Colquhoun.

Sarnia City Council

City and County
Four to be elected

City Council
Four to be elected

St. Clair
The following were the results for mayor and deputy mayor of St. Clair.

Mayor
Incumbent mayor Steve Arnold did not run for re-election. Running to replace him included ward one councillor Tracy Kingston and former councillor Jeff Agar.

Deputy mayor

Warwick

Mayor
Incumbent mayor Jackie Rombouts was challenged by former mayor Todd Case.

References

Lambton
Lambton County